The Weatherman is Gregory Alan Isakov's third full-length album, released in 2013. The album was recorded in solitude outside the quiet mountain town of Nederland, Colorado over the course of a year and a half.

The Weatherman peaked at number 102 on the Billboard 200 albums chart during a two-week stay on the chart.

Background
Explaining the new album, Isakov said, "To me, the idea of a weatherman is really powerful. There's a guy on television or on the radio telling us the future, and nobody cares. It's this daily mundane miracle, and I think the songs I chose are about noticing the beauty in normal, everyday life." Nathaniel Rateliff provided background vocals.

Reception
Simon Holland of Folk Radio wrote of the album – "There is an overall consistency of approach. This is an album of gentle swells, intimate voices, with ripples of grace notes and heavenly choirs adding to the emotional ebb and flow. It’s a gently paced 41 and a bit minutes of music that is quietly beguiling, rather than attention seeking, but when you do pay proper intent, the rewards are many."

Jedd Ferris from The Washington Post said, "From start to finish, the album keeps an even-keel mood, but in an age of ubiquitous Americana genre mashing, it's a welcome change of pace."

Track listing

Personnel
Gregory Alan Isakov – vocals, guitars, banjo, piano, organ, keyboards, drums, ukulele, pedal steel
Jamie Mefford – drums, god noises, background vocals
Phil Baker – cello, background vocals
Jeb Bows – violin, viola, mandolin, background vocals
James Han – piano, organ
Bonnie May Paine – saw, washboard, background vocals
Nathaniel Rateliff – background vocals
Julie Davis – background vocals
Natalie Tate – background vocals
Reed Foehl – background vocals
John Grigsby – upright bass, electric bass
Wil Schlatmann – accordion
Reyn Ouwehand – mellotron, timpani, piano

Production
Gregory Alan Isakov, Jamie Mefford – executive production
Gregory Alan Isakov, Jamie Mefford, Reyn Ouwehand (on "Second Chances") – engineering 
David Glasser – mastering

References

2013 albums